Mary Lee Jensvold is a senior lecturer at Central Washington University. She was the Director of the Chimpanzee and Human Communication Institute (CHCI) located on the campus of Central Washington University. CHCI was the home of the chimpanzee Washoe and four other chimpanzees who use the signs of American Sign Language to communicate with one another and their human caregivers.

Jensvold studies communication and other behaviors in chimpanzees. She had been working with Washoe and her family since 1986. In 1985 she received a B.A. in Psychology from the University of Oregon, in 1989 a M.S. in Experimental Psychology from Central Washington University, and in 1996 a Ph.D. in Experimental Psychology from the University of Nevada, Reno.

She specializes in ethological studies of great apes, animal intelligence, communication, and language. Her studies include chimpanzee conversational skills, imaginary play in chimpanzees, and environmental enrichment for captive chimpanzees. She is currently Senior Lecturer in the Primate Behavior and Ecology Program and the Anthropology Department at Central Washington University. She also serves on the Advisory Council of METI (Messaging Extraterrestrial Intelligence).

See also
Loulis
Deborah Fouts
Roger Fouts
Koko

References

External links
http://www.cwu.edu/anthropology/mary-lee-jensvold Jensvold  official website at CWU 
http://www.cwu.edu/anthropology/sites/cts.cwu.edu.anthropology/files/documents/jensvold%20vita%207-18.pdf Jensvold official CV
Friends of Washoe
Central Washington University - Primate Behavior & Ecology Program
Central Washington University - Anthropology Department

Animal communication
Animal intelligence
University of Oregon alumni
Central Washington University alumni
University of Nevada, Reno alumni
Year of birth missing (living people)
Living people
People involved with sign language